The 2014 Regional League Division 2 (also known as the AIS League Division 2 for sponsorship reasons) was the 9th season of the Regional League Division 2, it had redirected from the division 2, since its establishment in 2006. The 83 clubs will be divided into 6 groups (regions)

2014 Regional League Round All locations

2014

red Zone:2014 Regional League Division 2 Bangkok Metropolitan Region
Yellow Zone:2014 Regional League Division 2 Central & Eastern Region 
Pink Zone:2014 Regional League Division 2 Central & Western Region
Green Zone: 2014 Regional League Division 2 Northern Region   
  Orange Zone:2014 Regional League Division 2 North Eastern Region 
Blue Zone:2014 Regional League Division 2 Southern Region

List of qualified teams

Bangkok & field (2)
 Thai Honda (Winner)
 BCC Tero (Runner-up)

Central & Eastern (2)
 Prachinburi United (Winner)
 Maptaphut Rayong (Runner-up)

Central & Western (2)
 Hua Hin (Winner)
 Phetchaburi (Runner-up)

Northern (2)
 Sukhothai (Winner)
 Phichit (Runner-up)

North Eastern (2)
 Ubon UMT  (Winner)
 Udon Thani (Runner-up)

Southern (2)
 Prachuap Khiri Khan (Winner)
 Satun United (Runner-up)

Champions League round table

Group A

Group B

3/4 Place
First Leg

Second Leg

Sukhothai won 5–4 on aggregate.

Final
First Leg

Second Leg

1–1 on aggregate. Prachuap Khiri Khan won on away goals.

Champions
The Regional League Division 2 2014 winners were Prachuap F.C.

See also
 2014 Thai Premier League
 2014 Thai Division 1 League
 2014 Thai FA Cup
 2014 Thai League Cup
 2014 Kor Royal Cup
 Thai Premier League All-Star Football

 
Thai League T4 seasons
3